, also known by his Chinese style name , was a politician and bureaucrat of Ryukyu Kingdom.

Anki was born to an aristocrat family called Mō-uji Ikegusuku Dunchi. He was the 15th head of Ikegusuku Dunchi, and his father Ikegusuku Anyū (also known as Mō Zōkō ), was a Sanshikan from 1848 to 1862.

Anki was selected as a member of the Sanshikan in 1873. In 1876, Ryukyu had to break off diplomatic relations with Qing China under the pressure of Imperial Japan. Anki led a mission to Tokyo to complaint with it (Yonabaru Ryōketsu, Kōchi Chōjō, Kyan Chōfu, Uchima Chōchoku and Ishatō Seiei as assistant), but Japanese ignored.

In the year 1877, Anki became seriously ill. He sent Kōchi Chōjō back to Ryukyu, suggested that Ryukyu should seek for China's help. Not long after he died in Tokyo, his body was returned to Shuri.

References
池城安規 (いけぐすく・あんき)
池城安規 デジタル版 日本人名大辞典+Plusの解説

1829 births
1877 deaths
People of the Ryukyu Kingdom
Ryukyuan people
19th-century Ryukyuan people
Ueekata
Sanshikan